This is a list of Maratha dynasties and Maratha princely states.

Historical Maratha dynasties with original clans spread globally 

† - States annexed by the British East India Company

Maratha Princely States

The Marathas ruled much of India in the period immediately preceding the consolidation of British rule in India. The Maratha states came to form the largest bloc of princely states in the British Raj, in terms of territory and population.

The Maratha Salute state and Head of State by precedence
 Baroda, title Maharaja Gaikwad, Hereditary salute of 21-guns
 Gwalior, title Maharaja Shinde, Hereditary salute of 21-guns
 Indore (Holkar State), title Maharaja Holkar, Hereditary salutes of 19-guns
 Kolhapur State, title Maharaja Bhonsle Chhatrapati, Hereditary salutes of 19-guns
 Dewas State Senior, title Maharaja, Hereditary salute of 15-guns
 Sangli, title Raja, Hereditary salute of 11-guns
 Bhor (Gandekar State), title Raja, Hereditary salute of 9-guns
 Jawhar State, title Maharaja, Hereditary salute of 9-guns
 Savantwadi (Sawantwadi), title Raja, Hereditary salute of 9-guns
 Mudhol State, title Raja, Hereditary salute of 9-guns

Non-salute states 
Non-salute Maratha states, alphabetically:
 Akkalkot State , title Raja
 Aundh State, title Pant Pratinidhi
 Kolaba State, title Sarkhel (until the first half of the 18th century)
 Jamkhandi State, title Raja
 Jath State, title Raja
 Kurundvad Junior, title Rao
 Kurundwad Senior, title Rao
 Miraj Junior, title Rao Saheb Patwardhan 
 Miraj Sangli Senior|Miraj Sangli senior, title Rao Saheb Patwardhan 
 Phaltan State, title Maharaj
 Surgana State, title Raja
 Ramdurg State, title Saheb
 Sandur State, title Raja

States Annexed by the British under the Doctrine of Lapse
 Nagpur State (1818–1853) – Annexed by the East India Company under Doctrine of Lapse in 1853.
 Satara state – Abolished in 1848 by the East India Company under Doctrine of Lapse.
 Thanjavur – Annexed by the East India Company under Doctrine of Lapse.
 Jhansi state – Annexed by the East India Company under Doctrine of Lapse; recaptured by Rani Lakshmi Bai (4 June 1857 – 4/5 April 1858).
 Jalaun State - Annexed by the East India Company under Doctrine of Lapse in 1840.

See also

References

External links and sources 
 India Princely States K-Z,  WorldStatesmen

Maratha Empire
Maratha dynasties
India history-related lists
Lists of dynasties